Airport Tetovo (Macedonian: Аеродром Тетово, Aerodrom Tetovo) was a military airport of YPA, most sophisticated on the Balkan Peninsula in that time. It was situated 8 km south from Tetovo, in the present North Macedonia, by the Tetovo-Gostivar highway and near the village of Zherovjane. Later on it was abandoned and open again as an airport for sport needs. Over time it was ruined and today there is no debris from the airport.

References
 "The Tetova and Vrbasko Airports", CIA report CIA-RDP82-00457R001700050004-8, 19 July 1948.

Airports in North Macedonia